The Virginia miner bee (Andrena virginiana) is a species of miner bee in the family Andrenidae. Another common name for this species is the Virginia andrena. It is found in North America.

References

Further reading

 
 

virginiana
Articles created by Qbugbot
Insects described in 1960